Paul Berry may refer to:

 Paul Berry (politician) (born 1976), Northern Ireland unionist politician
 Paul Berry (animator) (1961–2001), British stop-motion animator and director
 Paul Berry (cricketer) (born 1968), English cricketer
 Paul Berry (footballer, born 1958), former English footballer for Oxford United
 Paul Berry (footballer, born 1978), former English footballer for Chester City
 Paul Berry (television) (born 1944), Washington, D.C. journalist
 Paul S. Berry (born 1957), American investigator of HIV
 Paul Edward Berry, American botanist and curator

See also
 Paul Barry (disambiguation)